Paul von Bruns was a German surgeon. He was born in Tübingen, and was the son of surgeon Victor von Bruns. His father-in-law was Protestant theologian Karl Heinrich Weizsäcker.

Bruns was born July 2, 1846. In 1882, Bruns became director of the surgical clinic at Tübingen, as well as a full professor at the University. He was the author of works on numerous medical subjects — laryngotomy for removal of growths in the larynx, acute osteomyelitis, gunshot wounds, limb operations and the treatment of goiters, to name a few. 

In 1885, he founded Beiträge zur klinischen Chirurgie (Contributions to Clinical Surgery), and was its editor until his death. With Ernst von Bergmann (1836-1907) and Jan Mikulicz-Radecki (1850-1905), he published the four-volume Handbuch der Chirurgie (Handbook of Surgery). He died – June 2, 1916 in Tübingen.

References 

 Paul von Bruns obituary, British Medical Journal, 11 November 1916

German surgeons
1846 births
1916 deaths
People from Tübingen
Academic staff of the University of Tübingen
Military personnel of Württemberg
Grand Officers of the Order of the Crown (Romania)

Recipients of the Order of the Rising Sun